The Edekiri languages are spoken in a band across Togo, Benin and Nigeria. The group includes:
the Ede dialect cluster, including Ife;
Itsekiri (Nigeria, up to 1 million speakers);
the Yoruboid languages Ulukwumi and Mokole;
Yoruba, by far the largest of the cluster with about 55 million speakers.

See also
Yoruboid languages

References

Yoruboid languages